Yevhenii V'iacheslavovych Orlov (also Evgeni Orlov, ; born January 30, 1989, in Kryvyi Rih, Ukrainian SSR) is an amateur Ukrainian Greco-Roman wrestler, who played for the men's super heavyweight category. He won a bronze medal in his respective division at the 2012 European Wrestling Championships in Belgrade, Serbia, and silver at the 2013 European Wrestling Championships in Tbilisi, Georgia. Orlov is also a member of the wrestling team for Ukraina Dnipropetrovsk, and is coached and trained by Oleksii Valdaiev.

Orlov represented Ukraine at the 2012 Summer Olympics in London, where he competed for the men's 120 kg class. He received a bye for the preliminary round of sixteen match, before losing out to Turkish wrestler and two-time Olympian Rıza Kayaalp, who was able to score four points in two straight periods, leaving Orlov without a single point.

References

External links
Profile – International Wrestling Database
NBC Olympics Profile

1989 births
Living people
Olympic wrestlers of Ukraine
Wrestlers at the 2012 Summer Olympics
Sportspeople from Kryvyi Rih
Ukrainian male sport wrestlers
20th-century Ukrainian people
21st-century Ukrainian people